Reference Re Farmers' Creditors Arrangement Act is a decision of the Judicial Committee of the Privy Council on the constitutionality of the Farmers' Creditors Arrangement Act as part of the bankruptcy and insolvency jurisdiction of the Parliament of Canada.

Background
By 1934, the farm debt problem in Canada, which had been provoked by the Great Depression, reached a scale where provincial moratory legislation could not resolve it, as it could not remove the farmer from his position of default. The last agricultural census reported that 244,201 farms (33.61% of all farms in Canada) reported having mortgages totalling $677,000,000 (16.75% of the value of all farms, or 49% of the value of owned farms). Cash flow problems also resulted in a significant increase in the amount of short-term obligations. It reached the point where Prime Minister R.B. Bennett decided to introduce remedial legislation to address it at the federal level, based in large part on the Companies' Creditors Arrangement Act passed in the previous year.

The Act's constitutionality was attacked on two grounds, in that the Parliament of Canada lacked jurisdiction, when enacting legislation concerning bankruptcy and insolvency:

 to deprive a secured creditor of his right to realize his security fully for the recovery of the debt owing to him, where such security consists of a conventional charge upon the property of the insolvent or affecting that right by subjecting him in respect of it to the discretionary order of a tribunal.
 to frame it in such a way as to affect the rights of the government of a province as creditor of an insolvent

Accordingly, a reference question was presented to the Supreme Court of Canada, asking:

At the Supreme Court of Canada
By 5-1, the SCC held that the Act was intra vires of the Parliament of Canada.

Majority (Duff CJ)
The grounds of attack were dismissed by Duff CJ as follows:

L'Union St-Jacques v Bélisle, in the 1874 judgment given by Lord Selborne, construed the federal power over bankruptcy and insolvency in very wide terms, which had been affirmed in 1934 in the Reference Re Companies' Creditors Arrangement Act
In 1932, the Privy Council had already ruled that the Parliament of Canada could deal with the privilege attaching to debts owing to the Crown in the right of a province and to take away any priority accorded to such debts by the law of a province, to which Duff CJ declared, "The legislative authority in bankruptcy matters to deal with debts owing to a province is no less than the authority to deal with debts owing to the Dominion."

Dissent (Cannon J)
Cannon J declared that the Act could not be constitutional, as it:

did not provide for the rateable distribution of the assets of the debtor nor for the discharge of the debt
in establishing Boards of Review, did not provide for proper bankruptcy proceedings, unlike what had been set out in the Companies' Creditors Arrangement Act
had "nothing to do directly with agriculture, with the science, the art or the process of supplying human wants by raising the products of the soil"

However, he did hold that s. 17 of the Act (which provided for the adjustment of interest rates on certain farm mortgages) was constitutional under the federal interest power.

At the Privy Council
The Board upheld the majority decision of the SCC. In so doing, Lord Thankerton found nothing wrong with the Board of Review framework, noting with approval that "it cannot be maintained that legislative provision as to compositions, by which bankruptcy is avoided, but which assumes insolvency, is not properly within the sphere of bankruptcy legislation." He also rejected the contention that a secured creditor would, as a result of the composition, be deprived of his property, observing that "the reduction of the debt itself or an extension of time for its payment... is a familiar feature of compositions."

Impact
Many Canadian legal commentators at the time expected that the FCAA, together with 1933's Companies' Creditors Arrangement Act, (which was effectively under collateral attack) would be declared unconstitutional as encroaching upon the provincial power over property and civil rights in relation to the rights of secured creditors, and they were astonished when both were upheld.

Further reading

Notes

References

Canadian insolvency case law
Canadian federalism case law
Judicial Committee of the Privy Council cases on appeal from Canada
1937 in Canadian case law
Supreme Court of Canada reference question cases